Hugo Sánchez Portugal (15 June 1984 – 8 November 2014) was a Spanish-born Mexican footballer and sports commentator with Televisa Deportes. He was the son of former player and manager of the Mexico national football team, Hugo Sánchez.

Club career
Sánchez Portugal was born in Spain when his father was with Atlético Madrid. Sánchez Portugal played as a striker for Pumas UNAM, when his father was the manager manager, Sánchez Portugal. His debut for Pumas was on 15 May 2004 against Monterrey. During his short stay with Atlante, he did not appear in any club matches.

Personal life and death
Sánchez Portugal was the son of former Mexico footballer Hugo Sánchez and his first wife Emma Portugal.

After a short-lived playing career, Sánchez was Director of Physical Culture and Sports at the Miguel Hidalgo facility.

On 8 November 2014, he was found dead in his Polanco apartment. The cause of death was later confirmed to be carbon monoxide poisoning, due to obstructed ventilation from a gas-fired water boiler.

Honours
Primera División de Mexico (2): Clausura 2004, Apertura 2004

References

External links

1984 births
2014 deaths
Footballers from Madrid
Association football defenders
Mexican footballers
Liga MX players
Mexican expatriates in Spain
Club Universidad Nacional footballers
Atlante F.C. footballers
Deaths from carbon monoxide poisoning
Accidental deaths in Mexico